The 2008 World Professional Billiards Championship, the top international professional competition in English billiards, was held between 23 and 27 July 2008 at the Northern Snooker Centre in Leeds, England. The 16 players were divided into four groups of four, with the top two in each group advancing into the knock-out round.

Mike Russell won his ninth World Professional Billiards Championship title after beating Geet Sethi 1821–1342 in the final.

Group round

Group A

Group B

Group C

Group D

Knock-out round

References

External links
 Cue Sports India: Break Board
 Cue Sports India: Snapshots

2008
World Professional Billiards Championship
World Professional Billiards Championship
Sports competitions in Leeds
July 2008 sports events in the United Kingdom
Cue sports in the United Kingdom